The Dahl–Nygaard Prize is awarded annually to a senior researcher with outstanding career contributions and a younger researcher who has demonstrated great potential. The senior prize is recognized as one of the most prestigious prizes in the area of software engineering, though it is a relatively new prize.

The winners of both awards are announced at the European Conference on Object Oriented Programming (ECOOP). The prizes are named after Ole-Johan Dahl and Kristen Nygaard, two Norwegian pioneers in the area of programming and simulation. The prize was created by the Association Internationale pour les Technologies Objets (AITO) in 2004.

The recipients of the prize are:
 2022, Berlin: Dan Ingalls (senior prize) and Magnus Madsen (junior prize)
 2021, Aarhus: Kim Bruce (senior prize) and Karim Ali (junior prize)
 2020, Berlin: Jan Vitek (senior prize) and Jonathan Bell (junior prize)
 2019, London: Laurie Hendren (senior prize) and Ilya Sergey (junior prize)
 2018, Amsterdam: Lars Bak (senior prize) and Guoqing Harry Xu (junior prize)
 2017, Barcelona: Gilad Bracha (senior prize) and Ross Tate (junior prize)
 2016, Rome: James Noble (senior prize), and Emina Torlak (junior prize)
 2015, Prague: Bjarne Stroustrup (senior prize) and Alexander J. Summers (junior prize)
 2014, Uppsala: William Cook (senior prize), Robert France (senior prize), and Tudor Gîrba (junior prize)
 2013, Montpellier: Oscar Nierstrasz (senior prize) and Matthew Parkinson (junior prize)
 2012, Beijing: Gregor Kiczales (senior prize) and Tobias Wrigstad (junior prize) 
 2011, Lancaster: Craig Chambers (senior prize) and Atsushi Igarashi (junior prize)
 2010, Maribor: Doug Lea (senior prize) and Erik Ernst (junior prize)
 2009, Genoa: David Ungar (senior prize)
 2008, Paphos: Akinori Yonezawa (senior prize) and Wolfgang De Meuter (junior prize)
 2007, Berlin: Luca Cardelli (senior prize) and Jonathan Aldrich (junior prize)
 2006, Nantes: Erich Gamma, Richard Helm, Ralph Johnson, and (posthumously) John Vlissides
 2005, Glasgow: Bertrand Meyer (senior prize) and Gail C. Murphy (junior prize)

See also 

 List of computer science awards

References

External links 
 

Computer science awards